Q46 may refer to:
 Q46 (New York City bus)
 Al-Ahqaf, a surah of the Quran